The Angstel is a small river between Abcoude and Loenersloot in the Netherlands, about halfway between Amsterdam and Utrecht. The Angstel is about 6 km (3.75 mi) long and connects the Gein and Holendrecht rivers with the Aa and Winkel rivers. East of the Angstel is the Amsterdam–Rhine Canal.

Originally the Angstel was a tributary to the Utrechtse Vecht. The river marks the border of the municipality De Ronde Venen. Along the river are several Buitenplaats and the castle of Loenersloot.

There are four bridges over the river: the Dorpsbrug Baambrugge in Baambrugge, and the Hulksbrug, the Heinkuitenbrug and the Derde in Abcoude.

Rivers of the Netherlands
Rivers of Utrecht (province)
De Ronde Venen
Stichtse Vecht